The 2016 S.League (also known as the Great Eastern Yeo's S.League for sponsorship reasons) was the 21st season of the S.League, the top-flight Singaporean professional league for association football clubs, since its establishment in 1996. The season began on 13 February 2016, and concluded on 28 October 2016. DPMM FC were the defending champions.

Teams 
A total of 9 teams competed in the league. Albirex Niigata (S) and DPMM FC were invited foreign clubs from Japan and Brunei respectively.

Stadiums and locations

Personnel and sponsoring
Note: Flags indicate national team as has been defined under FIFA eligibility rules. Players may hold more than one non-FIFA nationality.

Managerial changes

Foreigners 
Players name in bold indicates the player is registered during the mid-season transfer window.

 Albirex Niigata (S) is an all-Japanese team and do not hire any foreigners.

League table

Results

Matchday 1

Matchday 2

Matchday 3

Matchday 4

Matchday 5

Matchday 6

Matchday 7

Matchday 8

Matchday 9

Matchday 10

Matchday 11

Matchday 12

Matchday 13

Mid-week

Matchday 14

Matchday 15

Matchday 16

Matchday 17

Matchday 18

Matchday 19

Matchday 20

Matchday 21

Matchday 22

Matchday 23

Matchday 24

Matchday 25

Matchday 26

Matchday 27

 The match, originally scheduled on 19 February, was postponed due to bad weather.

Season statistics

Scoring

Top scorers

Hat-tricks 

Note
4 Player scored 4 goals

Discipline

Player

Most yellow cards: 7
Al-Qaasimy Rahman (Geylang International)
Stanely Ng (Geylang International)
Anumanthan Kumar (Hougang United)
Faiz Salleh (Hougang United)
Nurhilmi Jasni (Hougang United)
Raihan Rahman (Hougang United)
Shakir Hamzah (Tampines Rovers)

Most red cards: 2
Madhu Mohana (Warriors)

Club

Most yellow cards: 61
Geylang International

Most red cards: 5
Warriors

S-League Awards Night Winners

References

External links 
 Official site

2016 domestic association football leagues
2016
1